Zapote is a district of the Zarcero canton, in the Alajuela province of Costa Rica.

History 
Zapote was created on 22 July 1939 by Decreto Ejecutivo 35. Segregated from San Carlos canton.

Geography 
Zapote has an area of  km² and an elevation of  metres.

Locations
 Poblados (villages): Quina (part), San Juan de Lajas, Santa Elena

Demographics 

For the 2011 census, Zapote had a population of  inhabitants.

Transportation

Road transportation 
The district is covered by the following road routes:
 National Route 141

References 

Districts of Alajuela Province
Populated places in Alajuela Province